William McCann was a Scottish footballer who played as a goalkeeper. McCann was the first choice goalkeeper for Liverpool during the first half of the 1894–95 season. After conceding 11 goals in 3 games he was replaced as the keeper by Matt McQueen, he was restored to first choice keeper in a 4–0 win over West Bromwich Albion F.C. He made his last appearance for the club in February 1895 and left the club soon afterwards.

References

Scottish footballers
English Football League players
Liverpool F.C. players
1871 births
Year of death missing
Abercorn F.C. players
Association football goalkeepers